is a Japanese swimmer who won a bronze medal in the 4 × 200 m freestyle relay at the 2001 World Aquatics Championships. Her team finished in fifth place, but the Australian and US squads were disqualified. She also competed in three events at the 2004 Summer Olympics. Her best achievement was fifth place in the 4 × 100 m medley relay.

References

1981 births
Living people
Swimmers at the 2004 Summer Olympics
Olympic swimmers of Japan
Japanese female freestyle swimmers
Asian Games medalists in swimming
Swimmers at the 2002 Asian Games
World Aquatics Championships medalists in swimming
Universiade medalists in swimming
Asian Games silver medalists for Japan
Asian Games bronze medalists for Japan
Medalists at the 2002 Asian Games
Universiade bronze medalists for Japan
Medalists at the 2003 Summer Universiade
21st-century Japanese women